Albert Mikhaylov (born 15 October 2002) is a Belarusian professional footballer who plays for Energetik-BGU Minsk.

References

External links 
 
 

2002 births
Living people
Sportspeople from Vitebsk
Belarusian footballers
Association football midfielders
FC Smorgon players
FC Energetik-BGU Minsk players
FC Lida players